The 2022 Toronto Argonauts season was the 64th season for the team in the Canadian Football League and their 149th year of existence. The Argonauts won the 109th Grey Cup over the Winnipeg Blue Bombers by a score of 24–23.  This was the 18th time the Argonauts have won the championship, a league record. The Argonauts held their training camp on the campus of the University of Guelph in Guelph, Ontario.

The 2022 CFL season was the second season for head coach Ryan Dinwiddie and the third season for Michael Clemons as general manager.

Offseason

CFL Global Draft
The 2022 CFL Global Draft took place on May 3, 2022. With the format being a snake draft, the Argonauts selected fourth in the odd-numbered rounds and sixth in the even-numbered rounds.

CFL National Draft
The 2022 CFL Draft took place on May 3, 2022. The Argonauts had the sixth selection in each of the eight rounds of the draft after losing the East Final and finishing third in the 2021 league standings. The team also acquired another second-round pick after trading Nick Arbuckle to the Edmonton Elks.

Preseason
The Argonauts played their home preseason game at Alumni Stadium in Guelph, Ontario.

Schedule

 Games played with colour uniforms.

Regular season

Standings

Schedule
The Argonauts were the home team for a neutral site game for the Week 6 match-up with the Saskatchewan Roughriders. It was confirmed on March 24, 2022, that the game would be played in Wolfville, Nova Scotia at Raymond Field as part of the Touchdown Atlantic series. Due to a COVID-19 outbreak among the Roughriders, the week 7 game against the Roughriders was rescheduled from July 23 to July 24.

 Games played with colour uniforms.
 Games played with white uniforms.

Post-season

Schedule 

 Games played with colour uniforms.

Team

Roster

Coaching staff

References

External links
 

Toronto Argonauts seasons
2022 Canadian Football League season by team
2022 in Canadian football
2022 in Ontario
Grey Cup championship seasons